is a train station in Mine, Yamaguchi Prefecture, Japan.

Lines 
West Japan Railway Company
Mine Line

References

External links
Official Website

Railway stations in Japan opened in 1905
Railway stations in Yamaguchi Prefecture